Scaleless dragonfish may refer to:

Bathophilus nigerrimus, a species of the genus Bathophilus, barbeled dragonfishes
Chirostomias pliopterus, a species of barbeled dragonfish found in the Atlantic Ocean
Leptostomias gladiator, a species of barbeled dragonfish found worldwide
Eustomias schmidti, a type of dragonfish
Melanostomias bartonbeani, a species of the genus Melanostomias, barbeled dragonfishes

See also
Stomiidae, a family of deep-sea ray-finned fish

Flagellostomias boureei, a species of barbeled dragonfish found in the ocean depths worldwide
Grammatostomias flagellibarba, a species of barbeled dragonfish